Stanley R. Kimbrough (born April 24, 1966) is a retired American professional basketball player.

Born in Tuscaloosa, Alabama, the 5'11" (1.80 m) and 153 lb (69 kg) point guard attended both the University of Central Florida and Xavier University. Kimbrough amassed 2,103 points in his four years of college. He played 10 games with the Detroit Pistons of the National Basketball Association (NBA) during the 1989-90 NBA season, and in 1990 signed with the Golden State Warriors but was waived a week later, prior to the start of the 1991 season. Kimbrough also played three games for the Sacramento Kings in 1992.

In addition to his NBA career, Kimbrough played four seasons in the Continental Basketball Association (CBA) with the Grand Rapids Hoops, Oklahoma City Cavalry, Yakima Sun Kings, La Crosse Catbirds and Rochester Renegade. He averaged 9.7 points and 5.2 assists in 138 career CBA games.

Kimbrough currently runs his own basketball camp for youth, operating out of Cincinnati, Ohio.

References

External links
Career statistics
Xavier Musketeers bio

1966 births
Living people
American expatriate basketball people in Canada
American men's basketball players
Basketball players from Alabama
Detroit Pistons players
Grand Rapids Hoops players
La Crosse Catbirds players
Point guards
Rochester Renegade players
Sacramento Kings players
Sportspeople from Tuscaloosa, Alabama
UCF Knights men's basketball players
Undrafted National Basketball Association players
Xavier Musketeers men's basketball players
Yakima Sun Kings players